The Hill Hotel, also known as Kensington Tower, is a historic building located in Downtown Omaha, Nebraska. The building is one of the last existing examples of Colonial Revival architecture in Omaha. It is located on the historic 16th Street Mall, and contains 12 floors of apartments, with a book store on the first floor.

References

External links

National Register of Historic Places in Omaha, Nebraska
Hotel buildings on the National Register of Historic Places in Nebraska